The original name of Mueang district, Uttaradit, was Bang Pho. This district was under the control of Phi Chai District. Later, it was established as Uttaradit Province and Bang Pho District became the capital district. It was changed to Mueang Uttaradit District recently. The district is the seat of government and the center of economic activity of Uttaradit Province. Uttaradit is 483 km north of Bangkok.

Geography
The district is surrounded by the following districts:
 North – Den Chai District (Phrae Province) and Tha Pla District.
 East – Tha Pla and Thong Saen Khan Districts.
 South – Thong Saen Khan and Tron Districts.
 West – Laplae District.

History
In the past, Mueang District was called Bang Pho Tah It. It grew rapidly due to its harbor. King Rama V ordered the capital moved from Phi Chai District to Muang District. Next, in the reign of King Rama VI, the king ordered the incorporation of Mueang District into Uttaradit Province.

Climate
Uttaradit used to hold the record for the highest temperature ever recorded in Thailand:  observed at Uttaradit on 27 April 1960. This was broken when temperatures in Mae Hong Son reached  on 28 April 2016.

Uttaradit has a tropical savanna climate (Köppen climate classification Aw). Winters are dry and very warm. The monsoon season runs from May through October, with heavy rain and somewhat cooler temperatures during the day, although nights remain warm.

Transport 
Uttaradit is served by a station on the State Railway of Thailand. The nearest airport is at Phitsanulok.

Notable people
Narong Prangcharoen (b. 1973), composer

References

External links

Website of the town 

Populated places in Uttaradit province
Cities and towns in Thailand